Robert Arrowsmith (born 21 May 1952) is an English former cricketer who played 43 first-class matches and one List A game for Lancashire County Cricket Club between 1975 and 1979. After leaving Lancashire, he later played for Northumberland in the Minor Counties Cricket Championship.

External links

1952 births
Living people
English cricketers
Lancashire cricketers
People from Denton, Greater Manchester
Northumberland cricketers